Mayuri is a 1985 Indian Telugu-language biographical dance film directed by Singeetam Srinivasa Rao and produced by Ramoji Rao. Based on the life of Sudha Chandran, the film stars her in the titular role while P. L. Narayana, Nirmalamma, Y. Vijaya, Potti Prasad, K. K. Sharma, S. R. Raju and Suthi Veerabhadra Rao played supporting roles.

The film was premiered at the 1985 International Film Festival of India. The film was screened retrospectively, during the 2014 International Film Festival of India in Celebrating Dance in Indian cinema section. The film won 14 Nandi Awards the most by any other Telugu film. It was subsequently dubbed into Malayalam and Tamil as Mayoori and remade as Naache Mayuri (1986) in Hindi.

Plot 
Mayuri is a real story of classical dancer Sudha Chandran, who lost her leg in an accident on her way from Trichy to Madras in June 1981. The story depicts how she got a Jaipur foot and fights her way back as a dancer and succeeds in life.

Cast 
Sudha Chandran as Mayuri Olpam
Veeramachaneni Subhakar as Mohan
P. L. Narayana as Father of Mayuri
Nirmalamma as Grandmother of Mayuri
Y. Vijaya as Stepmother of Mayuri
Chakri Toleti as Stepbrother of Mayuri
Mukku raju
Potti Prasad as Cop

Soundtrack 

The music was composed by S. P. Balasubrahmanyam and the lyrics were written by Veturi and Mankombu Gopalakrishnan ( Malayalam version).

Awards 
Nandi Awards
The film won 14 Nandi Awards presented by the Government of Andhra Pradesh in various categories.
 Best Feature Film - Gold - Ramoji Rao
 Best Director – Singeetam Srinivasa Rao
 Best Supporting Actress – G. Nirmalamma
 Best Screenplay Writer – Singeetham Srinivasa Rao, K. S. Prakash Rao & Ganesh Patro
 Best Cinematographer – Srihari Anumolu
 Best Music Director – S. P. Balasubrahmanyam
 Best Male Playback Singer – S. P. Balasubrahmanyam
 Best Editor – Gowtham Raju
 Best Art Director – V. Bhaskara Raju
 Best Choreographer – Seshu
 Best Audiographer – Yemmi
 Second Best Story Writer – Usha kiran Movies Unit
 Special Jury Award – Sudha Chandran
 Special Jury Award – P. L. Narayana

Filmfare Awards
Best Director Telugu – Singeetam Srinivasa Rao (1985)

 National Film Awards
 National Film Award – Special Jury Award for Sudha Chandran in 1985

References

External links 
 Mayuri film at IMDb.

1980s biographical films
1980s musical films
1980s Telugu-language films
1985 films
Films about amputees
Films directed by Singeetam Srinivasa Rao
Films scored by S. P. Balasubrahmanyam
Indian biographical films
Indian dance films
Indian musical films
Telugu films remade in other languages